Nachaba flavisparsalis is a species of snout moth in the genus Nachaba. It is found in Brazilian state of Espírito Santo.

References

Moths described in 1891
Chrysauginae